Analog television in Uruguay had a history of more than 50 years since it began in 1956, with the first television channel, Channel 10.
Since then Uruguay counts with three other channels, Channel 12 Teledoce, Channel 4 Monte Carlo TV and Television Nacional Uruguay

Digital television
On August 27, 2007, the Uruguayan government issued a decree stating that the DVB-T and DVB-H standards would be adopted. On February 17, 2011, the government issued a new decree revoking the former one, and selecting ISDB-T as the standard to be adopted.
Uruguay hoped for neighboring countries to reach an agreement on an HDTV standard, but so far that does not seem to be the case.
 Brazil adopted the ISDB-T system in November 2007 after a very extensive and consistent study (executed by Mackenzie University and Television Engineering Association) where ISDB-T standard presented a more robust signal, more flexible services including mobile TV reception for free and excellent user interactive services. The implementation rollout through the country has been very successful. The prices of digital TV receivers and set-top boxes are rapidly decreasing.
 Argentina is now analyzing ISDB-T to verify if the standard also attends their needs. There is a wish to implement only one digital TV standard in all Mercosur Area, and if Argentina chooses ISDB-T it will be an important step for that integration (except for Uruguay and Colombia).
 Uruguayan URSEC authorities provided no information on which road they would go until late in 2007. On August 27, 2007, Ursec settled on DVB-T and DVB-H. The TV sets being sold in Uruguay seem to be closer to ATSC HDTV-based standards (60 Hz systems, with ATSC tuners in some cases).  Most of the DVD-based content in the country is NTSC/60 Hz-based, while the TV standard in use is PAL/50 Hz-based.  Most of the analog TV sets sold are PAL-N, PAL-M and NTSC-capable, while most DVD players are multiregion. Authorities are not asking retailers to identify which standard the HDTV sets sold adhere to. It seems that most HDTV standards support both 60/50 streams, so that should not be an issue since the TV sets will have to also support both standards to be certified.
 2010: All subscription television operators offer HDTV premium packages at varying prices. The offers rely on proprietary set-top boxes.

Most viewed channels

References

External links
  With interviews to Cristina Morán, Julio Sánchez Padilla, Julia Möller, and Cacho de la Cruz.